Clavatula gabonensis, common name the Gabon turrid, is a species of sea snail from the family Clavatulidae. This marine gastropod mollusk occupies benthic habitats in tropical climatic regions.

Description
The shell grows to a length of 35 mm. Data such as maturity, morphometric measurements or life span have not been studied in this species. Few information is known regarding the life cycle and mating behavior of sea snail. This species is a non-broadcast spawner. Life cycle does not include trocophore stage.

Distribution
This species occurs in the Atlantic Ocean along Senegal and Gabon.

Conservation status 
This species has not yet been evaluated by IUCN.

References

External links
https://www.biolib.cz/en/taxonimage/id421501/?taxonid=582222&type=1

gabonensis
Gastropods described in 1923